Berkley is a town in Bristol County, Massachusetts, United States, located south of Boston and east of Providence, Rhode Island. The population was 6,764 according to the 2020 census, making it the least populated town in the county.

History 

The present town of Berkley, then belonging to the neighboring towns of Dighton and Taunton, was first settled in 1638. It was officially incorporated as a separate town in 1735. The town was named for the philosopher and bishop George Berkeley (1685–1753), who lived in Newport, Rhode Island from 1728 to 1731. The change in the spelling to "Berkley" was likely due to the carelessness of the engrossing clerk of the Massachusetts General Court.

Berkley's old Town Hall, a two-story white clapboard building located on Berkley Common, was built in 1849. When a new Town Hall was built across the street in 2015, the Old Town Hall became home to the Berkley Historical Society. The new 9,778-square-foot Town Hall was built in 2014–2015, at a cost of $3.5 million. The new building contains a senior center, office, kitchen, and high-efficiency LED lighting.

Geography

The town is bordered by the Taunton River and Dighton to the west, Taunton to the north and northeast, Lakeville to the east, and the Assonet Bay and Freetown to the south.

Near the southwestern corner of the town is Dighton Rock State Park, the home of Dighton Rock, a tidal boulder along the Taunton River that is well known for its strange markings, which have been totally or partly attributed to Norsemen, Wampanoags, or Portuguese explorer Miguel Corte-Real. At the southern tip of Berkley Neck which points into the confluence of the Taunton River and the Assonet River, there is a small island, named "Conspiracy Island", whose name origin remains obscure.

The town can be accessed by two state routes, Route 24 and Route 79. Route 24, a four-lane divided freeway, bisects the town, and includes one exit for the town at Padelford Street. Route 79 passes along the town's border with Lakeville, and meets Route 140 just across the town line in Taunton. The Berkley–Dighton Bridge crosses the Taunton River to the Segreganset neighborhood of Dighton.

Myricks is an association community or populated place (Class Code U6) and a junction of railroad lines in Berkley.

Demographics

As of the census of 2000, there were 5,749 people, 1,843 households, and 1,566 families residing in the town. The racial makeup of the town was 96.7% White, 0.6% African American, 0.14% Native American, 0.4% Asian, 0.03% Pacific Islander, 1.06% from other races, and 1.11% from two or more races. Hispanic or Latino of any race were 1.0% of the population.

There were 1,843 households, out of which 47.1% had children under the age of 18 living with them, 73.8% were married couples living together, 7.5% had a female householder with no husband present, and 15.0% were non-families. 10.8% of all households were made up of individuals, and 3.9% had someone living alone who was 65 years of age or older.  The average household size was 3.11 and the average family size was 3.35.

In the town, the population was spread out, with 30.5% under the age of 18, 6.0% from 18 to 24, 36.0% from 25 to 44, 21.1% from 45 to 64, and 6.5% who were 65 years of age or older.  The median age was 35 years. For every 100 females, there were 98.7 males.  For every 100 females age 18 and over, there were 97.3 males.

The median income for a household in the town was $66,295, and the median income for a family was $69,222. Males had a median income of $45,154 versus $31,639 for females. The per capita income for the town was $21,652.  About 0.7% of families and 2.5% of the population were below the poverty line, including 0.6% of those under age 18 and 7.6% of those age 65 or over.

Government

Town government
Executive Branch: Three-member Board of Selectmen with three-year staggered terms.

George F. Miller: Chairman

Wendy F. Cochrane: Member

Vacant: 

Town Clerk: Heather J. Almy

Legislative Branch: Open Town Meeting.

State government
Representative in General Court
Norman Orrall (R-Lakeville), 12th Bristol District

Senator in General Court
Marc Pacheco (D-Taunton), 1st Plymouth and Bristol District

Governor's Councillor
Joseph C. Ferreira (D-Somerset), 1st District

Federal government
Representative to the United States House of Representatives
Joseph P. Kennedy, III (D-Brookline) (4th Massachusetts District)

Senators in the United States Senate
 Ed Markey (D)
 Elizabeth Warren (D)

Education

Berkley Community School – Grades Pre-K through 4 : South Main Street, Berkley, MA
Berkley Middle School – Grades 5 through 8  : North Main Street, Berkley, MA
Somerset Berkley Regional High School – Grades 9 through 12 : 625 County Street, Somerset, MA (beginning in Fall 2011)

High school students may also attend Bristol County Agricultural High School in Dighton, Bristol-Plymouth Regional Technical School in Taunton, or local private and parochial schools; the closest Catholic high school is Bishop Connolly High School in Fall River.

Local attractions

The Bridge Village Heritage Park at 70 Elm Street is a tiny park at the foot of the Berkley-Dighton Bridge on the Taunton River. It is a spot for fishing, picknicking, and putting in a canoe or kayak. Opened in October 2006, this  area is aimed at canoeing and kayaking. Motor boats and boats in tow are prohibited.

Dighton Rock State Park is a park that holds the Dighton Rock, a boulder with petroglyphs of uncertain age and authorship, in a museum on an  site on the Taunton River. Trails and a stage for theatre productions highlight the park.

Berkley Congregational Church was established just two years after the town's founding in 1735. Located at 13 South Main Street, the church has offered continuous religious services since its inception.

Notable people

 Thomas Andros, minister at Berkley for 46 years
 C. G. W. French, jurist and politician, was born in Berkley
 Tony Gaffney, basketball player in the Israeli Basketball Premier League, lived in Berkley

See also 
Dighton Rock
Greater Taunton Area
Taunton River Watershed

References

External links
Town of Berkley official website
Berkley Board of Assessors

 
Towns in Bristol County, Massachusetts
Populated coastal places in Massachusetts
Greater Taunton Area
Populated places established in 1638
Providence metropolitan area
Towns in Massachusetts
1638 establishments in Massachusetts